The Oruge tree frog (Litoria modica) is a species of frog in the subfamily Pelodryadinae. It is found in New Guinea. Its natural habitats are subtropical or tropical moist montane forests and rivers.

Names
It is known as wyt in the Kalam language of Papua New Guinea.

References

Litoria
Amphibians of New Guinea
Amphibians described in 1968
Taxonomy articles created by Polbot